The Cancer Genome Atlas (TCGA) is a project to catalogue the genetic mutations responsible for cancer using genome sequencing and bioinformatics. The overarching goal was to apply high-throughput genome analysis techniques to improve the ability to diagnose, treat, and prevent cancer through a better understanding of the genetic basis of the disease.

TCGA was supervised by the National Cancer Institute's Center for Cancer Genomics and the National Human Genome Research Institute funded by the US government. A three-year pilot project, begun in 2006, focused on characterization of three types of human cancers: glioblastoma multiforme, lung squamous carcinoma, and ovarian serous adenocarcinoma. In 2009, it expanded into phase II, which planned to complete the genomic characterization and sequence analysis of 20–25 different tumor types by 2014. Ultimately, TCGA surpassed that goal, characterizing 33 cancer types including 10 rare cancers.

The project initially set out to collect and characterize 500 patient samples, more than most genomics studies of its time, and used a variety of different molecular techniques. Techniques included gene expression profiling, copy number variation profiling, SNP genotyping, genome wide DNA methylation profiling, microRNA profiling, and exon sequencing. With restraints of nascent technology and costs at the start of the project, many array-based technologies and limited targeted gene sequencing were performed. During II, TCGA was able to begin performing whole exome and whole transcriptome sequencing on all cases and whole genome sequencing on 10% of the cases used in the project.

Goals
The goal of TCGA's pilot project was to establish an infrastructure to collect, molecularly characterize, and analyze 500 cancers and matched controls. The work required extensive cooperation among a team of scientists from various institutions and assessment of multiple burgeoning high-throughput technologies. TCGA wanted to not only generate high-quality and biologically meaningful genomic data, but also make that data freely available to the cancer research community. 

Three tumor types were explored during the pilot phase, glioblastoma multiforme (GBM) and high-grade serous ovarian adenocarcinoma, and lung squamous carcinoma. Following success of the pilot phase, TCGA expanded its effort to characterize additional cancer types and provide a rich and large genomic data set for further cancer research discovery.

Management
TCGA was co-managed by scientists and managers from the National Cancer Institute (NCI) and the National Human Genome Research Institute (NHGRI). With the expansion of TCGA from the pilot phase to Phase II in October 2009,  NCI created a TCGA Program Office to help manage the project. Dr. Jean Claude Zenklusen has been the director of the office since August 2013. 

The TCGA Program Office was responsible for the operation of six Genome Characterization Centers, seven Genome Analysis Centers, the Biospecimen Core Resource, the Data Coordination Center, and approximately one third of the sequencing done for the project by the three Genome Sequencing Centers. In addition, the TCGA Project Office was responsible for coordinating the accrual of tissues for TCGA. Dr. Carolyn Hutter, project manager for NHGRI, directed two thirds of the sequencing at the Genome Sequencing Centers.

Members from the NCI and the NHGRI teams, along with principal investigators funded by the project, comprised the Steering Committee. The Steering Committee was tasked with overseeing the scientific validity of the project while the NCI/NHGRI administrative team ensured that the scientific progress and goals of the project were met, the project was completed on time and on budget, and the various components of the project worked together.

Tissue accrual

Tissue requirements varied from tissue type to tissue type and from cancer type to cancer type. Disease experts from the project's Disease Working Groups helped to define the characteristics of the typical tissue samples accrued as "standard of care" in the United States and how TCGA could best utilize the tissue. For example, the Brain Disease Working Group determined that samples containing more than 50% necrosis would not be suitable for TCGA and that 80% tumor nuclei were required in the viable portion of the tumor. TCGA followed some general guidelines as a starting point for collecting samples from any type of tumor, including a minimum of 200 mg in size, no less than 80% tumor nuclei and a matched source of germline DNA (such as blood or purified DNA). In addition, institutions submitting tissues to TCGA were required to include a minimal clinical data set as defined by the Disease Working Group, signed consents which have been approved by their institution's IRB, as well as a material transfer agreement with TCGA.

In 2009, NCI removed approximately $130 million of ARRA from the NCI's "Prime Contract" with Science Applications International Corporation (SAIC) to fund tissue accrual and a variety of other activities through the NCI Office of Acquisition. $42 million was available for tissue accrual through NCI using "Requests for Quotations" (RFQs) and "Requests for Proposals" (RFPs) to generate purchase orders and contracts, respectively. RFQs were primarily used for the collection of retrospective samples from established banks while RFPs were used for the prospective collection of samples. TCGA finalized sample collection in December, 2013, with nearly 20,000 biospecimens.

Institutions that contributed samples to TCGA were paid, and gained advance access to molecular data generated on their samples, while maintaining a link between the TCGA unique identifier and their own unique identifier. This permitted contributing institutions to link back to the clinical data for their samples and to enter into collaborations with other institutions that had similar data on TCGA samples, thus increasing the power of outcome analysis.

Organization
TCGA managed a number of different types of centers that were funded to generate and analyze data. TCGA was the first large-scale genomics project funded by the NIH to include significant resources to bioinformatic discovery. The NCI has devoted 50% of TCGA appropriated funds, approximately $12M/year, to fund bioinformatic discovery. Genome Characterization Centers and Genome Sequencing Centers generated data. Two separate Genome Data Analysis Centers utilized the data for bioinformatic discovery. Two centers were funded to isolate biomolecules from patient samples and one center is funded to store the data. This workflow has evolved over the years and is not known as NCI's Genome Characterization Pipeline.

Biospecimen Core Resource
The Biospecimen Core Resource (BCR) was responsible for verifying the quality and quantity of tissue shipped by tissue source sites, isolating DNA and RNA from the samples, performing quality control of these biomolecules, and shipping processed samples to the GSCs and GCCs.  The International Genomics Consortium was awarded the contract to initiate the BCR for the pilot project. There were two BCRs funded by NCI at the start of the full project: Nationwide Children's Hospital and the International Genomics Consortium. The BCRs were recompeted in 2010 and Nationwide Children's Hospital was awarded the contract.

Genome Sequencing Centers
Three Genome Sequencing Centers (GCCs) were co-funded by NCI and NHGRI: the Broad Institute, McDonnell Genome Institute at Washington University and Baylor College of Medicine.  All three of these sequencing centers have shifted from Sanger sequencing to next-generation sequencing (NGS). A variety of NGS technologies were tested and implemented simultaneously.

Genome Characterization Centers
The NCI funded seven Genome characterization centers: the Broad Institute, Harvard, University of North Carolina, MD Anderson Cancer Center, Van Andel Institute, Baylor College of Medicine and the British Columbia Cancer Center.

Data Coordinating Center
The Data Coordinating Center (DCC) was the central repository for TCGA data. It was also responsible for the quality control of data entering the TCGA database. The DCC also maintained the TCGA Data Portal, which was where users could access processed TCGA data. This work was performed under contract by bioinformatics scientists and developers from SRA International, Inc. The DCC did not host raw sequencing data, however. NCI's Cancer Genomics Hub (CGHub) was the secure repository for storing, cataloging, and accessing sequence-related data. This work was performed by scientists and staff at the University of California, Santa Cruz Genomics Institute. Since 2017, all types of data were moved to NCI's Genomic Data Commons.

Genome Data Analysis Centers
Seven Genome Data Analysis Centers (GDACs) funded by the NCI/NHGRI were responsible for the integration of data across all characterization and sequencing centers as well as biological interpretation of TCGA data. The GDACs included The Broad Institute, University of North Carolina, Oregon Health and Science University, University of California, Santa Cruz, MD Anderson Cancer Center, Memorial Sloan Kettering Cancer Center, and The Institute for Systems Biology. All seven GDACs worked together to develop an integrated data analysis pipeline.

Cancer Types Selected for Study
A preliminary list of tumors for TCGA to study was generated by compiling incidence and survival statistics from the SEER Cancer Statistic website. In addition, U.S. current “Standard of Care” was considered when choosing the top 25 tumor types, as TCGA was targeting tumor types where resection prior to adjunct therapy was the standard of care. Availability of samples also played a critical role in determining which tumor types to study and the order in which tumor projects are started; the more common the cancer type, the more likely that samples would be accrued quickly for study. This resulted in common tumor types, such as colon, lung and breast cancer becoming the first tumor types entered into the project, before rare tumor types.

Cancer types selected for study byTCGA included: lung squamous cell carcinoma, kidney papillary carcinoma, clear cell kidney carcinoma, breast ductal carcinoma, renal cell carcinoma, cervical cancer (squamous), colon adenocarcinoma, stomach adenocarcinoma, rectal carcinoma, hepatocellular carcinoma, Head and neck (oral) squamous cell carcinoma, thyroid carcinoma, bladder urothelial carcinoma – nonpapillary, uterine corpus (endometrial carcinoma), pancreatic ductal adenocarcinoma, acute myeloid leukemia, prostate adenocarcinoma, lung adenocarcinoma, cutaneous melanoma, breast lobular carcinoma and lower grade glioma, esophageal carcinoma, ovarian serous cystadenocarcinoma, lung squamous cell carcinoma, adrenocortical carcinoma, Diffuse Large B-cell lymphoma, paraganglioma & pheochromocytoma, cholangiocarcinoma, uterine carcinosarcoma, uveal melanoma, thymoma, sarcoma, mesothelioma, and testicular germ cell cancer.

TCGA began accruing samples for all of these tumor types simultaneously. The tumor types with the most samples accrued were entered into the characterization pipeline first. The rarer tumor types which were more difficult to accrue and tumor types for which TCGA could not identify a source of high-quality samples were entered into the TCGA production pipeline in the second year of the project. This gave the TCGA Program Office additional time to accrue sufficient samples for the project.

TCGA and the Mouse Organogenesis Cell Atlas (MOCA) were elaborated by machine learning and deep learning to compare and find correlation between cancer and embryonic cells in early cell development and differentiation. They were also applied to distinguish changes in gene expression patterns between various types of tumors from an unknown source.

TCGA Publications

Glioblastoma multiforme
In 2008, the TCGA published its first results on glioblastoma multiforme (GBM) in Nature. These first results characterized and analyzed 91 tumor-normal matched pairs. While 587 biospecimens were collected for the study, most were rejected during quality control: the tumor samples needed to contain at least 80% tumor nuclei and no more than 50% necrosis, and a secondary pathology assessment had to agree that the original diagnosis of GBM was accurate. A last batch of samples was excluded because the DNA or RNA collected was not of sufficient quality or quantity to be analyzed by all of the different platforms used in the study.

All of the data from this study, as well as data that has been collected since the publication were made publicly available at TCGA's Data Coordinating Center (DCC) for public access (later moved toe the Genomic Data Commons).
Most of the processed TCGA data is completely open access. For data that could potentially identify specific patients, users apply for controlled-data access to the Data Access Committee (DAC), which evaluates whether the end user is a bona fide researcher and is asking a legitimate scientific question that merits access to individual-level data. Data access credentials are now managed through NIH's dbGAP.

Since the publication of the first marker paper, several analysis groups within the TCGA Network have presented more detailed analyses of the glioblastoma data. An analysis group led by Roel Verhaak, PhD, Katherine A. Hoadley, PhD, and D. Neil Hayes, MD, successfully correlated glioma gene expression subtypes with genomic abnormalities. The DNA methylation data analysis team, led by Houtan Noushmehr, PhD and Peter Laird, PhD, identified a distinct subset of glioma samples which displays concerted hypermethylation at a large number of loci, indicating the existence of a glioma-CpG island methylator phenotype (G-CIMP). G-CIMP tumors belong to the proneural subgroup and were tightly associated with IDH1 somatic mutations.

Serous ovarian adenocarcinoma
TCGA reported on mRNA expression, microRNA expression, promoter methylation, DNA copy number, and exome sequencing of 316 tumor samples of high grade serous ovarian cancer in Nature in June 2011. The researchers found mutations of the gene TP53 in an overwhelming 96% of the cases analyzed, Recurrent mutations at lower frequency were found in a handful of other genes, including NF1, BRCA1, BRCA2, RB1 and CDK12.

TCGA researchers were also able to identify gene expression patterns that correlated with patient survival. They defined four subtypes of the cancer according to gene expression and DNA methylation patterns: immunoreactive, differentiated, proliferative, and mesenchymal. They also identified 68 genes as potential drug targets.

Colorectal carcinoma
TCGA reported on the exome sequence, DNA copy number, promoter methylation and messenger RNA characterization of 276 tumor samples of colon and rectal cancers in Nature in July 2012. 97 of the samples also underwent ultra-low coverage whole genome sequencing.

TCGA researchers discovered the same type of alterations in colon and rectal tumors, indicating that they are a single type of cancer. Some differences, such as hypermethylation, were apparent in tumors originating in the right colon. A subset of the tumors were found to be hypermutated; a majority of those also had high microsatellite instability. Two dozen significantly mutated genes and recurring copy number alterations were found. The study suggested new markers for aggressive colorectal carcinoma and an important role for MYC-directed transcriptional activation and repression.

Phase II: Expanding TCGA to 33 Cancer Types 
Fueled by the American Recovery and Reinvestment Act of 2009, NIH extended TCGA to cover 20 types of cancer. This included an effort to study rare cancers, which was enabled with support from patients, patient advocacy groups, and doctors. Starting in 2011, TCGA began holding Annual Scientific Symposiums to discuss and share novel biological discoveries on cancer, analytical methods and translational approaches using the data.

In December of 2013, TCGA concluded sample collection, having shipped and processed over 20,000 specimens. By the project’s completion, TCGA published “marker papers” describing the characterization and basic analyses covering 33 cancer types. For several cancer types, such as bladder urothelial carcinoma and GBM, additional cases were collected and a second analysis was performed.

Pan-Cancer Atlas Analyses
In 2013, TCGA published an initial Pan-Cancer analysis describing the "mutational landscape" defined as frequently recurring mutations identified from exome sequencing of 3,281 tumours from 12 commonly occurring cancer subtypes. The twelve subtypes studied were breast adenocarcinoma, lung adenocarcinoma, lung squamous cell carcinoma, endometrial carcinoma, glioblastoma multiforme, squamous cell carcinoma of the head and neck, colon cancer, rectal cancer, bladder cancer, kidney clear cell carcinoma, ovarian carcinoma and acute myeloid leukaemia.

In 2018, the TCGA Research Network published what is collectively known as the Pan-Cancer Atlas: a collection of 35 papers summarizing the work accomplished by TCGA and describing overarching themes of cancer biology elucidated by analyzing all of TCGA data as a whole.

The main topics are (1) cell-of-origin patterns, which groups and analyzes tumors based on biological system or histological subtype; (2) oncogenic processes, which considers the complex downstream impacts alterations may have on molecular pathways and the microenvironment, and (3) signaling pathways, which surveys the role different pathways play in different cancers and their potential vulnerabilities.

The completion of the Pan-Cancer Atlas marked the official end of TCGA as a program, though the data, analysis methods, and other resources produced by TCGA continues to serve as a resource for researchers. For example, TCGA’s whole-genome data were analyzed as part of the Pan-Cancer Analysis of Whole Genomes (PCAWG), an international effort to analyze 2,600 cancer whole genomes to understand somatic and germline variations in both coding and non-coding regions.

Analysis of Non-coding Regions 
TCGA researchers also set out to systematically study the non-coding regions of the genome of multiple cancers. The team applied the assay for transposase-accessible chromatin using sequencing (ATAC-seq) to 410 TCGA tumor samples covering 23 primary cancers in order to gain insights into gene dysregulation in cancer. ATAC-seq is a low-cost method for identifying regions of open or active chromatin and positions of DNA-binding proteins.

Through ATAC-seq, researchers were able to identify a tens of thousands of potential DNA regulatory elements specific to different cancers and cell types. This provided insights into how gene dysregulation could help drive cancer initiation and progression. Understanding chromatin accessibility of known immune cell-specific regulatory elements also provided clues into the immune microenvironment and the availability of immunotherapy targets. The study, “The chromatin  landscape of primary human cancers,” was published in 2018 in Science.

See also

 Cancer Genome Project at the Wellcome Trust Sanger Institute
 International Cancer Genome Consortium
 List of biological databases

References

External links
 The Cancer Genome Atlas
 NCI Office of Cancer Genomics
 Cancer Genomics Hub at UC Santa Cruz
 NCI Wiki

Cancer research
Cancer genome consortium